Sunfair is an unincorporated community in the Mojave Desert, within San Bernardino County, California.

State Route 62 traverses the area south of Sunfair in an east–west direction. Sunfair lies near the northern border of Joshua Tree National Park

The community is served by the Morongo Unified School District.

The Hi-Desert Medical Center is located here.

Area landmarks
Other nearby geographic features include:
 Hi Desert Airport (FAA ID: L80) at 5500 Sunfair Road near the south extent of the community .
 Sunfair Heights, California — neighborhood to the north.

See also

References

Unincorporated communities in San Bernardino County, California
Populated places in the Mojave Desert
Unincorporated communities in California